Nikiforovsky (masculine), Nikiforovskaya (feminine), or Nikiforovskoye (neuter) is the name of several rural localities in Russia:
Nikiforovsky (rural locality), a settlement in Yaroslavsky Rural Okrug of Yefremovsky District of Tula Oblast
Nikiforovskoye, Leningrad Oblast, a logging depot settlement under the administrative jurisdiction of Kamennogorskoye Settlement Municipal Formation in Vyborgsky District of Leningrad Oblast
Nikiforovskoye, Moscow Oblast, a village in Nikolskoye Rural Settlement of Odintsovsky District of Moscow Oblast
Nikiforovskoye, Ryazan Oblast, a village in Ivanovsky Rural Okrug of Starozhilovsky District of Ryazan Oblast
Nikiforovskoye, Smolensk Oblast, a village in Saveyevskoye Rural Settlement of Roslavlsky District of Smolensk Oblast
Nikiforovskoye, Tver Oblast, a village in Stolipinskoye Rural Settlement of Zubtsovsky District of Tver Oblast
Nikiforovskaya, Kargopolsky District, Arkhangelsk Oblast, a village in Usachevsky Selsoviet of Kargopolsky District of Arkhangelsk Oblast
Nikiforovskaya, Fedorogorsky Selsoviet, Shenkursky District, Arkhangelsk Oblast, a village in Fedorogorsky Selsoviet of Shenkursky District of Arkhangelsk Oblast
Nikiforovskaya, Yamskogorsky Selsoviet, Shenkursky District, Arkhangelsk Oblast, a village in Yamskogorsky Selsoviet of Shenkursky District of Arkhangelsk Oblast
Nikiforovskaya, Tarnogsky District, Vologda Oblast, a village in Verkhnespassky Selsoviet of Tarnogsky District of Vologda Oblast
Nikiforovskaya, Ust-Kubinsky District, Vologda Oblast, a village in Verkhneramensky Selsoviet of Ust-Kubinsky District of Vologda Oblast